Becampanel (INN) (code name AMP397) is a quinoxalinedione derivative drug which acts as a competitive antagonist of the AMPA receptor (IC50 = 11 nM). It was investigated as an anticonvulsant for the treatment of epilepsy by Novartis, and was also looked at as a potential treatment for neuropathic pain and cerebral ischemia, but never completed clinical trials.

References

AMPA receptor antagonists
Amines
Anticonvulsants
Lactams
Secondary amines
Nitro compounds
Quinoxalines
Abandoned drugs